The Other Side of This Life may refer to:

 "The Other Side of This Life", a song by Fred Neil on his album Bleecker & MacDougal
 "The Other Side of This Life", a Grey's Anatomy season 3 episode